Heavenly Pop Hits – The Best of The Chills is a greatest hits album by New Zealand group The Chills, released in 1994.

Track listing
All songs written by Martin Phillips.
"Heavenly Pop Hit"
"I Love My Leather Jacket"
"Doledrums"
"Double Summer"
"Oncoming Day"
"Rolling Moon"
"I'll Only See You Alone Again"
"Never Never Go"
"Wet Blanket"
"Pink Frost"
"Kaleidoscope World"
"Look for the Good in Others"
"House with a Hundred Rooms"
"Part Past Part Fiction"
"Male Monster from the Id"
"This is the Way"

Ice Picks (limited edition bonus disc)
"Oncoming Day ("Brave Words" Outtake)" 3:00
"Party in My Heart" 3:15
"Living in the Jungle" 1:22
"Big Dark Day" 3:41
"I Wish I Could Do Without You" 2:16
"Green Eyed Owl" 5:29

References

1994 greatest hits albums
The Chills albums
Flying Nun Records compilation albums